A crémaillère is a French, mechanical term for the rack, or a straight bar with teeth on one edge designed to work into the teeth of a wheel or a pinion (French pignon) that predates the Renaissance. The term was generally applied in English to engineering applications which had notched, toothed or drilled surface, even when only visually so, such as the edge of the staircase. The term is also applied to the rack railway.

During the 17th to 19th centuries the term was widely applied to lines of entrenchment that are usually formed in a saw-tooth pattern, known as indented lines, particularly during sieges. These lines are usually employed on banks of rivers, or on ground which is more elevated than, or which commands, that of the enemy. The defense of these lines is sometimes strengthened by double redans, and flat bastions constructed at intervals, along their front. During the American Civil War, the Confederate States Army used such defenses in  Centerville, Virginia in 1862, while the Union Army used them in from 1883 to 1865 at Fort C. F. Smith in Alexandria County  (now Arlington County), Virginia.

The term is also applied in artillery to refer to an indented battery, or à Crémaillère constructed with salient and re-entering angles for obtaining an oblique, as well as a direct fire, and to afford shelter form an enfilade fire of the enemy.

The term is also used in surgical instruments, where the "crémaillère" is the toothed hook between the legs of the needle holder, serving the purpose of keeping the needle holder locked and thus the needle in place in the needle holder.

In modern French, the crémaillère may also refer to the hook in the fireplace upon which a cooking pot was traditionally hung.  The phrase “pendre la crémaillère” (literally “to hang the chimney hook”) is an expression meaning “to have a housewarming party”.

Citations and notes

References
 Glossary of Automotive Terminology: French-English English-French, Engineering Standards and Data Dept, Society of Automotive Engineers, Chrysler Corporation, 1977
 Mahan, Dennis Hart, Prud'homme, John Francis Eugene, A Treatise on Field Fortification: Containing Instructions on the Methods of laying out, constructing, defending and attacking entrenchments with the general outlines also of the arrangement, the attack and defence of permanent fortifications, (3rd ed.) Confederate States of America Collection (Library of Congress), Joseph Meredith Toner Collection (Library of Congress), John Wiley, New York, 1862
 Henry Lee, (Colonel ), Military dictionary: comprising technical definitions: information on raising and keeping troops; actual service, including makeshifts and improved materiel; and law, government, regulation, and administration relating to land forces, D. Van Nostrand, Trubner and co, New York, 1861
 Spearman J. Morton, (Captain), The British gunner, (3rd Ed.)Military Library Whitehall, 1844

Military terminology
Fortification (architectural elements)
Gears

fr:Crémaillère